Saint-Jérôme is a provincial electoral district in the Laurentides region of Quebec, Canada that elects members to the National Assembly of Quebec.  Its territory corresponds exactly to the city of Saint-Jérôme.

It was created for the 2012 election from part of the former Prévost electoral district.  The Prévost electoral district consisted solely of the town of Prévost and of the city of Saint-Jérôme.  In the change from the 2001 to the 2011 electoral map, the eponymous municipality of Prévost was moved to the Bertrand electoral district; the Prévost electoral district became defunct and the remaining municipality of Saint-Jérôme became a separate new electoral district in its own right, named after itself.

Members of the National Assembly

Election results

^ Change is from redistributed results. CAQ change is from ADQ.

References

External links
Information
 Elections Quebec

Election results
 Election results (National Assembly)
 Election results (QuébecPolitique)

Maps
 2011 map (PDF)
2001–2011 changes to Prévost (Flash)
 Electoral map of Laurentides region
 Quebec electoral map, 2011 

Quebec provincial electoral districts
Saint-Jérôme